Ginásio Aecim Tocantins is an indoor sporting arena located in Cuiabá, Brazil. The capacity of the arena is 11,000 spectators. It hosts indoor sporting events such as basketball, concerts, futsal, handball, judo, table tennis and volleyball. It is used mostly for volleyball matches.

References

External links
Stadium information

Indoor arenas in Brazil
Sports venues in Mato Grosso
Cuiabá
Basketball venues in Brazil
Volleyball venues in Brazil